Pališkiai (formerly) is a village in Kėdainiai district municipality, in Kaunas County, in central Lithuania. According to the 2011 census, the village had a population of 71 people. Pališkiai de facto is part of Meironiškiai village.

At the beginning of the 20th century Pališkiai was an okolica.

Demography

References

Villages in Kaunas County
Kėdainiai District Municipality